Andrew Joel "A. J." Schable (born May 18, 1984) is a former American football defensive end. He was signed by the Arizona Cardinals as an undrafted free agent in 2006. He played college football at South Dakota. He is currently a firefighter in Sioux Falls, South Dakota.

Schable was also a member of the Philadelphia Eagles, New York Jets, Sacramento Mountain Lions.

Early years
Schable played high school football at Battle Creek-Ida Grove High School in Ida Grove, Iowa. He was a three sport letter winner in football, basketball, and track.

Professional career

Seattle Seahawks
Schable signed a future contract with the Seattle Seahawks on January 20, 2011.

External links
Just Sports Stats

1984 births
Living people
Players of American football from Iowa
American football defensive ends
American football fullbacks
American football tight ends
South Dakota Coyotes football players
Arizona Cardinals players
Philadelphia Eagles players
New York Jets players
Sacramento Mountain Lions players
Seattle Seahawks players
People from Ida Grove, Iowa